The Novo River is a river of Tocantins state, Brazil. It is a headwater of the Do Sono River. 

The river forms to the south of the  Jalapão State Park, a fully protected conservation unit created in 2001.
It runs north along the west boundary of the park to the point where it meets the Soninho River from the left to form the Do Sono River.

See also
List of rivers of Tocantins

References

Rivers of Tocantins